Trichodesma scotti is a species of plant in the family Boraginaceae. It is endemic to Socotra in Yemen. It is known from a few areas, where it is locally common in mountain thickets. It is a shrub producing cream-colored, funnel-shaped flowers in hanging inflorescences "that resemble the head of an upturned mop".

References

scotti
Endemic flora of Socotra
Vulnerable plants
Taxonomy articles created by Polbot